The 1991 Virginia Slims of Washington was a women's tennis tournament played on outdoor hard court at the William H.G. FitzGerald Tennis Center in Washington, D.C. in the United States and was part of the Tier II category of the 1991 WTA Tour. It was the 18th and last edition of the tournament and ran from August 19 through August 24, 1991. Second-seeded Arantxa Sánchez Vicario won the singles title and earned $70,000 first-prize money.

Finals

Singles
 Arantxa Sánchez Vicario defeated  Katerina Maleeva 6–2, 7–5
 It was Sánchez Vicario's 1st singles title of the year and the 6th of her career.

Doubles
 Jana Novotná /  Larisa Neiland defeated  Gigi Fernández /  Natasha Zvereva 5–7, 6–1, 7–6(12–10)

References

External links
 ITF tournament edition details
 Tournament draws

Virginia Slims of Washington
Virginia Slims of Washington
Virginia Slims of Washington
1991 in American tennis